Entre dos aguas is the first compilation album by the Spanish guitarist and composer Paco de Lucía.

Original 1975 LP track listing
 "Entre dos aguas"
 "Los pinares"
 "Jerezana"
 "En la caleta"
 "Punta del Faro"
 "Fandangos"
 "Malagueña de Lecuona"
 "Zarda de Monty"
 "Serrania de Málaga"
 "Andalucía de Lecuona"
 "Rumba improvisada"
 "Plazuela"

A CD version was released in 1981, one of the first commercial CDs. The track listing is the following:
 "Entre dos aguas" (1973)
 "Zorongo Gitano" (1972)
 "Río Ancho" (1976)
 "En La Caleta" (1972)
 "Convite" (1981)
 "Monasterio De Sal" (1981)
 "Panaderos Flamencos" (1969)
 "Punta Umbría" (1967)
 "Chanela" (1981)
 "La Niña De Puerta Oscura" (1972)
 "Castro Marín" (1981)
 "Gua'iras De Lucía" (1972)
 "Mantilla De Feria" (1969)
 "El Vito" (1972)

Additional musicians
Original LP musicians
 Ramón de Algeciras – Guitar on 1, 2, 6, 7, 8, 9, 10, 11, 12
 Jose Torregrosa – Musical director on 5, 6
 Enrique Jimenez – Guitar on 7, 8, 9, 10, 11, 12
 Cepero Isidro de Sanlucar – Guitar on 7, 8, 9, 10, 11, 12
 Julio Vallejo – Guitar on 7, 8, 9, 10, 11, 12

1981 CD version additional musicians
 Jose Torregrosa – Guitar on 1, 4, 8. Director on 3
 M. Lopez Quiroga – Director on 10
 Carles Benavent - Bass on duet "6 - Monasteriro de Sal"

Tracks not mentioned owned and composed by Paco de Lucía.

1975 compilation albums
Paco de Lucía albums